Of Heliotaxis and Cosmic Knifing is an EP by Abu Lahab, independently released on October 14, 2013. Quotes from Nico's Desertshore album serve as appendixes for Of Heliotaxis and Cosmic Knifing, with samples of "Le petit chevalier" used prominently in the opening and closing tracks.

Track listing

Personnel
Adapted from the Of Heliotaxis and Cosmic Knifing liner notes.
 Abu Lahab – vocals, instruments, cover art

References

External links 
 Of Heliotaxis and Cosmic Knifing at Discogs (list of releases)
 Of Heliotaxis and Cosmic Knifing on YouTube

2013 EPs
Abu Lahab (musical project) albums